Black Rain is a live EP of Black Rain, released in November 15, 1993 by TPOS. The set was performed during a supporting performance for punk rock band GG Allin & The Murder Junkies, which also happened to be Allins final show before dying of a drug overdose later in the night.

Track listing

Personnel 
Adapted from the Black Rain liner notes.

Black Rain
 Stuart Argabright – vocals, tape, percussion
 Chaz Cardoza (as Bones 23) – bass guitar, percussion, vocals
 Thom Furtado – drums
 Roy Mayorga – drums

Production and design
 Malcolm Tent (as The Malcolm Tent Mobile Unit) – recording

Release history

References

External links 
 
 

1993 EPs
Live EPs
Black Rain (band) albums